Yallaroi Shire was a local government area located in the New England region of New South Wales, Australia, about  south of Goondiwindi via Fossickers Way.

History
In August 1897, a public meeting was held in Warialda to consider "the desirableness of transferring the village into a municipality". The Warialda Municipality thus came into being on 30 March 1900. John Crane was elected its first mayor.

With the passage of the Local Government Act 1906, which established shires all over New South Wales, the Yallaroi Shire was gazetted to serve the surrounding district on 6 March 1906. On 29 December 1924, the Warialda municipality was absorbed into the shire.

On 17 March 2004, Yallaroi Shire was abolished and merged with the Bingara Shire and part of Barraba to form the Gwydir Shire.

Towns
 Warialda
 Coolatai
 Copeton
 Crooble
 Croppa Creek
 Gravesend
 Mungle
 North Star
 Warialda Rail
 Yagobe
 Yallaroi

Population

References

Former local government areas of New South Wales
New England (New South Wales)